Sterculinine is an alkaloid isolated from the Chinese drug Pangdahai (an extract of Sterculia lychnophora).

References

Lychnophora
Quinoline alkaloids
Lactams